Copperton was a mining town in the central Karoo region of South Africa. As a copper and zinc-mining area, Copperton saw its heyday between 1970 and the end of the 20th century, when it housed about 3,000 workers and their families; amenities included a school and recreation facilities, including a golf course.

History
The copper-zinc mine at Copperton, which had been opened in 1972, was shut down in 1991 by the Anglovaal Mining Group. The 2011 census found 57 inhabitants. Today, most of the buildings have been demolished and only a few houses are used by Armscor, who operate a weapons testing center, Alkantpan Test Range, in the area.

Renewable Power 

Several new renewable energy projects (solar and wind) have been allocated through the REIPPPP and these projects will be constructed in the vicinity of this town.

See also 
List of power stations in South Africa
Siyathemba Local Municipality

References

Populated places disestablished in 1991
Former populated places in South Africa